Barong temple is a 9th-century Hindu candi (temple) located approximately 800 meters east-southeast from Ratu Boko compound. The temple is located on a hill in Candisari hamlet, Bokoharjo village, Prambanan subdistrict, Sleman Regency, Yogyakarta, Indonesia. 
The temple is named barong according to its kala's head carving on top of the niches of its temples that resembles Barong.

Architecture
Unlike the other temples in Central Java, Barong Temple took shape as a stepped terraces locally known as punden berundak, which was an ancient design of pre-Hindu megalithic sacred structure in Java. This temple consists of three-level terraces. The first terrace is located on the west corresponds to the site topography, the second terrace is a stone structure measures is 90 x 63 square metres, while the third terrace measured 50 x 50 square metres. The entrance is located on the west side. In the middle of the west side there is a staircase up from the first terrace to the second terrace ascending about 4 metres high with the causeway width of 3 metres.

See also 

 Candi of Indonesia
 Kewu Plain
 Prambanan
 Ratu Boko
 Banyunibo
 Ijo
 Hinduism in Java

References

External links 

 Barong temple map in wikimapia

Barong
Mataram Kingdom
Cultural Properties of Indonesia in Yogyakarta